South African Australians are citizens or residents of Australia who are of South African descent.

According to the 2016 Australian census, 162,450 Australian residents were born in South Africa, making up 0.7% of the country's population, while 118,960 residents claimed "South African" ancestry, and another 4,865 stated their ancestry as "Afrikaner".

Most South African-born Australians are native English-speakers (118,147) while a large minority speak  Afrikaans at home (38,415). Afrikaners are particularly concentrated in greater Perth. While just 0.2% of Australian residents in 2016 spoke Afrikaans at home, 0.6% of the residents of greater Perth (11,393) did. While 24% of South Africa-born Australians are Afrikaans speakers, census figures suggest that over one-third of South African Australians living in Western Australia are.

Immigration from South Africa to Australia, particularly by professionals, accelerated in the 1990s. More than half of the South African Australians arrived following the election of Nelson Mandela in 1994. A behaviour stigmatised by white South Africans who remained in their homeland as "Packing for Perth" ("PFP") was also a humorous dig and reference to supporters of the Progressive Federal Party – a political party formed in 1977 that drew support mainly from liberal English-speaking white people. 

In 2007–2008, around 4,000 South Africans permanently settled in Australia, a slightly lower number than previous years.

Notable people
 Joany Badenhorst (Paralympic snowboarder)
 Wendy Botha (pro surfer)
 Robin Bell (athlete)
 Scherri-Lee Biggs (Miss Universe Australia 2011)
 Lauren Brant (former Hi-5 member)
 Kearyn Baccus (soccer player)
 Gavin Buckley (current mayor of Annapolis, Maryland)
 J. M. Coetzee (writer, 2003 Nobel Prize in Literature laureate)
 Bryce Courtenay (writer)
Michelle Cowan (AFL / AFLW Coach) 
 Collette Dinnigan (fashion designer)
Ceridwen Dovey (writer) 
 Anton Enus (SBS newsreader)
 Damian Cupido (Australian rules football player)
 Dane Haylett-Petty (rugby union football player)
 Dean Geyer (singer, and actor)
 David Gonski (chair, Australian Stock Exchange)
 Frances Hargreaves (actress)
 Cariba Heine (actress)
 Robert Holmes à Court (1937-1990) (businessman, Australia's richest person)
 Jason Johannisen (Australian Rules football player)
 Craig Johnston (soccer player)
 Dena Kaplan (actress)
 Gail Kelly (CEO, Westpac)
 Marius Kloppers (CEO, BHP)
 Marnus Labuschagne (Australian Test cricketer)
 Jessica Marais (actress)
 Sisonke Msimang (writer)
 Kerr Neilson (fund manager)
 Paul O'Brien (actor)
 Craig Reucassel (comedian)
 Lovemore N'dou (boxer)
 Clyde Rathbone (rugby player)
 Selwyn (R&B singer)
 Troye Sivan (actor and singer-songwriter)
 Tammin Sursok (actress)
 Daniel Vickerman (rugby player)
 Margaret Wild (writer)
 Nathaniel Willemse (singer)
 Young Pluto (boxer)
 Morné Morkel (Former South Africa International Cricketer)

See also 

 African Australians
 Australia–South Africa relations
 South African diaspora

References 

 
African Australian
Ethnic groups in Australia